Talara rufa is a moth in the subfamily Arctiinae. It was described by William Schaus in 1899. It is found in Paraná, Brazil.

References

Arctiidae genus list at Butterflies and Moths of the World of the Natural History Museum

Moths described in 1899
Lithosiini